Þjórsárdalur is a valley in Árnessýsla county in Iceland that lies between mount Búrfell alongside the river Þjórsá to the east and mount Skriðufell to the west. The valley is quite flattened over and pumicey after repeated eruption of the nearby volcano Hekla as well as other volcanoes in the vicinity like the Vatnaöldur volcanic system which produced Iceland's biggest known lavafield Þjórsá Lava (Þjórsárhraun) in prehistoric times or the Grímsnes volcanic system with the crater Kerið. Landmarks in Þjórsárdal include Þjóðveldisbærinn Stöng, Gjáin, Háifoss, and Vegghamrar.

Geography and Nature
Þjórsárdalur valley is divided into two valley floors: Rauðukamba in the eastern part; and Bergólfsstaðaá (towards the river Sandá) in the west.

On the inside of both valleys is the mountain Fossalda, and east of the river Fossá is Stangarfell. The next mountain towards the southwest is Skeljafell; after that, Sámsstaðamúli, and finally Búrfell (Þjórsárdal). The valleys join at the south end. West of Fossöldu are the mountains Flóamannafjöll, then Dímon, Selhöfði, Skriðufell and Ásólfsstaðafjall. Under Hagafjall are the capes Bringa and Gaukshöfði.

Vegetation
In the corner of the valley besides Ásólfsstöðum and Skriðufelli is a large forest. This area of Þjórsárdals is lush with vegetation, as are Búrfell's woods. Yet  (the Soil Conservation Service of Iceland) has continued to conduct extensive soil reclamation on the grounds covered by pumice with among other things lupins and grass species. Western Fossár has pumice as well that is cultivated, mostly within the enclosure of highland pasture called Gnúpverjaafréttur, but there are different grass species, including a lot of sea lyme grass. Landsvirkjun (Iceland's national electricity company) has cultivated the area around Búrfellsvirkjun and Þjóðveldisbærinn, and one can find there, among other things, a golf course.

In Gjáin and at Kjóaflöt there is a lot of vegetation, and it is especially scenic in Gjáin, since the Rauðá river winds through the cliff the ravine. There is a lot of angelica around the spring, as well as many species of moss and grass.

Places of interest
The farm of Þjóðveldisbærinn Stöng, which was covered by the ashes of mount Hekla's 1104 eruption, was excavated in 1939. 

It was rebuilt at about 10 km to the south of its former place near Burfellsvirkjun hydroelectric power station as the farm museum Þjóðveldisbærinn Stöng so that now one can see how fireplaces and other house fixtures looked during the Saga Age (ca 930-1030). 

A footbridge goes across the river Rauðá right at the bottom of the original place of Stöng. From Stöng it is popular to walk on foot to Gjáin.

Þjórsárdals's hot spring is west of the waterfall, east near Rauðukömbum. There is a hot spring bath, and an abundance of hot- and cold water that is freely flowing into the hot spring. Inside the valley is Háifoss, one of the highest waterfalls of Iceland. Skeiða- og Gnúpverjahreppur has provided a viewing platform west of Stangarfelli which is situated on the way from Hólaskógur. 

Near the farm museum is Hjálparfoss, which is a split waterfall in a dell that joins together in Búrfell.

Vegghamrar are rocky cliffs midway between Hallslaut and Rauðukamba. Under them lies the ancient Sprengisandsleið, and the mountain men Gnúpverja ride through here on the way to the mountains.

References

Forests of Iceland
Valleys of Iceland
Southern Region (Iceland)